Anthony James Gill (born July 17, 1965) is an American political scientist and adjunct professor of sociology at the University of Washington; he is a non-resident scholar at the Baylor University Institute for the Study of Religion.  Gill specializes in political economy, comparative politics and religion. He obtained his PhD (1994) and MA (1989) from the University of California, Los Angeles.

Theoretical approach and teaching 
Gill argues that religious activity will be higher in countries with lower levels of public sector welfare assistance. Building upon economic theory, he argues that state-sponsored social welfare substitutes for the traditional welfare services provided by churches. His analysis focuses on Christian nations in Europe and Latin America. Gill's current research agenda includes how local governments regulate church growth via property rights regulations. Gill has been an occasional guest host on a Christian talk radio—the Georgene Rice Show—that airs in Seattle and Portland, and he is a monthly guest on an Ellensburg, WA radio talk show. Gill attends the Duvall Church (Evangelical Methodist) in rural east King County (Duvall, WA).

"Tony Gill demonstrates that there are no boundaries between scholarship, classroom teaching and the many extracurricular contributions that provide students with the personal touch and the experiential learning opportunities that make a great research university a great place to learn."
- University of Washington Political Science Professor W. Lance Bennett

Publications 
Books
 Rendering Unto Caesar: The Catholic Church and the State in Latin America (University of Chicago Press, 1998)
 The Political Origins of Religious Liberty (Cambridge University Press, 2007)

Articles
 N.D. "Septics, Sewers and Secularization: How Government Regulation Flushes Religiosity Down the Drain."
 2006. “Will a Million Muslims March? Muslim Interest Organization and Political Integration in Europe.” Co-authored with Steven Pfaff. Comparative Political Studies 39 (7): 803-28.
 2005. “The Political Origins of Religious Liberty.” Interdisciplinary Journal of Research on Religion 1 (1): 1-35.
 2002. “A Political Economy of Religion.” In Sacred Markets, Sacred Canopies: Essays on Religious Markets and Religious Pluralism, ed. Ted G. Jelen. Lanham: Rowman-Littlefield.
 2001. “Religion and Comparative Politics.” Annual Review of Political Science 4: 117-38.

Awards 
 2009:  Distinguished Book Award, American Sociological Association’s Section on Religion, for The Political Origins of Religious Liberty
 1999: Distinguished Teaching Award, The University of Washington 
 1999: Best Paper Award, APSA Section on Religion and Politics, for “Religion and Political Attitudes in Latin America: Evidence from the World Values Survey”

References

External links
 University of Washington - faculty bio
 The Lehrman American Studies Center - faculty bio
 Anthony Gill CV - pdf

University of Washington faculty
American political scientists
University of California, Los Angeles alumni
1965 births
Living people
Baylor University people